Aix or AIX may refer to:

Computing 
 AIX, a line of IBM computer operating systems
An Alternate Index, for a Virtual Storage Access Method Key Sequenced Data Set
Athens Internet Exchange, a European Internet exchange point

Places

Belgium
Aix-sur-Cloie, in Wallonia

France
Aix-en-Provence, in the Bouches-du-Rhône department
Aix, Corrèze
Aix-en-Diois, in the Drôme department
Aix-en-Ergny, in the Pas-de-Calais department
Aix-en-Issart, in the Pas-de-Calais department
Aix-en-Othe, in the Aube department
Aix-en-Pévèle, in the Nord department
Aix-la-Fayette, in the Puy-de-Dôme department
Aix-les-Bains, in the Savoie department
Aix-Noulette, in the Pas-de-Calais department
Aixe-sur-Vienne, in the Haute-Vienne department
Île-d'Aix, island and commune of the Charente-Maritime department

Germany 
 Aix-la-Chapelle, or Aachen

United States
 Aix, Indiana
 Mount Aix, in Washington state

Other uses 
 Air India Express, an Indian airline
 Aircraft Interiors Expo, a trade fair in Germany
 Aix (bird), a genus of ducks
 Astana International Exchange, stock exchange in Nursultan, Kazakhstan supported by Astana International Financial Centre
 ISO 639-3 code for the Aigon language

See also
 Armani Exchange (abbreviated A|X, with a vertical bar resembling the letter I)